The Ivica Tunnel is a road tunnel in Montenegro, between the towns of Šavnik and Žabljak in the Drobnjaci region, which opened in December 2010. At 2.2 kilometers long it is the second longest vehicular tunnel in Montenegro.

References 

 Case Studies from Montenegro 2011/2012. Milovac, Dejan. Mrdović, Ines. Pgs 10–14.

Road tunnels in Montenegro
Tunnels completed in 2010
Transport in Montenegro